Patrik Johansson (born 2 April 1968) is a Swedish former footballer and football manager.

References

1968 births
Living people
Swedish football managers
People from Landskrona Municipality
Footballers from Skåne County